Joshua Paul Randall (born 15 April 1987), known professionally as J Rand (and formerly known as "J Randall"), is an American singer, songwriter, actor and dancer. He was formerly signed to Interscope Records but left the label in early 2013. Following a performance alongside Flo Rida on The Tonight Show with Jay Leno, USA TODAY named J Rand their "Artist on the Verge" for 2014. In 2017 he particapted with the boyband 5 alive at the talent show America's got talent. At the end of 2017 till November 2018 he was part of the musical show "Boybands Forever" and toured with 5 other boys in Germany. Shortly before the second tour in the fall of 2018 he published his new song "October" and used the tour and his fans to promote this and other songs.
Since 2020 he hosts the online version of the talent show America's Idol" called IG Idol.

Discography

Singles
 "Spirit of the Radio" (Step Up 3D Soundtrack) (2010)
 "Up Against the Wall" (2012)
 October (2018)

Promotional Releases
 "Can't Sleep" (feat. T-Pain) (2011)
 "Ride" (feat. Flo Rida & T-Pain) (2013)
 "Santa Gimme" (2013)
 "Sexual Habit" (2014)
 "Gold" (2015)
 ”October” (2018)

Featured in
2016: "Oh La La La" (Carolina Márquez feat. Akon & J Rand)

Mixtapes
 Heart Break Kid (2012)

Filmography

Television

Films

References

External links
 JRand's Official Website
 JRands Official Instagram

1987 births
Living people
Songwriters from Florida
21st-century American singers
21st-century American male singers
American male songwriters